Vikings: Wolves of Midgard is an action role-playing game developed by Slovak studio Games Farm and published by Kalypso Media. It is set in a fantasy world inspired by the Norse mythology.

Gameplay 
The gameplay is similar to that of Diablo in which the players create their own character, the players can choose their character appearance, gender and attributes. The game has several quests besides the main storyline and the game has an open world environment, they can explore snowy valleys, Viking cities, ice caverns, ancient tombs and several other places.

The gameplay progresses between linear, self-contained levels navigated through a hub area, namely the village of the Ulfung tribe from which the player character hails. The player can choose to run 'hunt' missions on already completed maps where objectives are set to kill a certain number of a nominated enemy, or they can choose 'raid' missions in which the story is progressed. Story missions include basic puzzles, collectibles and usually finish with a boss encounter. Instead of gaining experience, player collects blood which can be offered to gods in their altars. Wood and iron are the two resources needed to progress through the game, because they are used to upgrade the village itself, giving you new tiers of skills and equipments.

The game features both single-player and multiplayer for up to two players. Multiplayer support is via online local via local area network (LAN). Local co-op using the same screen or split-screen (also referred to as couch-co-op) is not supported, however this is a heavily requested feature, particularly for the console versions of the game. Developers have stated there are no plans for local couch-co-op at this time.  As of June 2017, two-player local co-op has been added to the PlayStation 4 version of the game.

Update Jan 18th 2023
There is now couch co-op on ps4

Synopsis

Setting and characters 
Vikings: Wolves of Midgard is set in the Shores of Midgard, a world based upon the mythology and history of the Vikings with a fantasy twist.  The game follows a warrior/shieldmaiden who recently become the newest chieftain of Ulfung Village, the home of the namesake tribe said to be consisted of outcasts and renegades, after saving their home from a Jötnar raid orchestrated by a powerful Jötunn called Grimnir. Around that time, Æsir and Vanir, two tribes that make up Gods of Asgard, once again locked in another war leaving the rest of the realm open to threats from their common enemies. Fortunately, this doesn't prevent five of the major Gods (Odin, Thor, Tyr, Skathi, and Loki) from bestowing gifts upon inhabitants of Ulfung Village in return of blood offering thus providing them, the protagonist in particular, an edge against their enemies as they rebuild their village and discover the truth behind the invasion.

Plot 
The protagonist returns to Ulfung Village in time to see it invaded by Grimnir's attack forces. Meeting Volund who just escaped their enemies' wrath, he gives them their first Healing Totem, Eir's Charity, before pressing on. In the ensuing battle, they save two of their fellow villagers who overwhelmed by Grimnir's army and even defeat the enemies' Jötunn commander forcing the rest of the invaders into retreating along the way. With their chieftain perished during the onslaught and the protagonist has proved themselves before their surviving kinsmen, they become the former's immediate successor.

Reception 

The game has won Slovak Game of the Year Awards in categories for the Best Game and the Best Visual Design.

References 

2017 video games
Action role-playing video games
PlayStation 4 games
Video games based on Norse mythology
Video games developed in Slovakia
indie video games
Video games featuring female protagonists
Video games set in the Viking Age
Windows games
Xbox One games